PO3 may refer to::

Phosphite
Petty officer third class
 PO3: an EEG electrode site according to the 10-20 system
 A videogame character from Inscryption